The Buccatoggio, or Bucatoggio, is a small coastal river in the department of Haute-Corse, Corsica, France.
It rises in the Monte San Petrone massif and flows into the Tyrrhenian Sea on the east of the island.

Course

It crosses the communes of San-Giovanni-di-Moriani, Santa-Maria-Poggio, San-Nicolao and Santa-Reparata-di-Moriani.
It rises in the commune of Santa-Reparata-di-Moriani between the  Monte Olmelli and the  Croce Di Zuccaro.
It flows southeast to the village of Santa-Reparata-di-Moriani, then in a generally east direction to the sea, which it enters to the south of Padulella-Moriani-Plage.

The river contains several large basins that visitors can swim in.
The dramatic Ucelluline Waterfall (Cascade de l'Ucelluline) is located beside the "Corniche Road" which runs along the eastern coastal plain.

Tributaries
The following streams (ruisseaux) are tributaries of the Buccatoggio (ordered by length) and sub-tributaries:

 Catarelli 
 Minaccio 
 Badionziole 
 La Piada 
 Casamora 
 Tasso 
 Emerini 
 Piova 
 Erbajolo 
 Trappola 
 Valitoti 
 Mortete 
 Casoli 
 Trefontane

Notes

Sources

Rivers of Haute-Corse
Rivers of France
Coastal basins of the Tyrrhenian Sea in Corsica